"Didn't Cha Know?" is a song recorded by American singer Erykah Badu for her second studio album Mama's Gun (2000). It was written by Badu and produced by fellow Soulquarian member J Dilla, and features a sample from Tarika Blue's song "Dreamflower" (1977). The song was released as the second single from Mama's Gun on November 28, 2000, by Motown Records.

"Didn't Cha Know?" failed to enter the US Billboard Hot 100, peaking at number 13 on its extension chart Bubbling Under Hot 100 Singles. It also peaked at number 28 on the US Hot R&B/Hip-Hop Songs. Despite its lackluster commercial performance, the song was nominated for Best R&B Song at the 44th Annual Grammy Awards (2002).

Controversy
"Didn't Cha Know" features a sample from American jazz and soul ensemble Tarika Blue's song "Dreamflower" (1977). The sample was used without prior permission from the group. However, Badu and Motown Records reached a settlement fee with Tarika Blue outside of court.

Track listings and formats

Charts

Weekly charts

Year-end charts

Release history

References

2001 singles
Erykah Badu songs
Song recordings produced by J Dilla
Songs written by Erykah Badu
2000 songs
Motown singles
Songs written by J Dilla
World music songs